Kabud Khani-ye Olya (also Romanized as Kabūd Khānī-ye ‘Olyā; also known as Kabūdkhāneh, Kabūd Khānī, and Kabūd Khānī-ye Bālā) is a village in Panjeh Ali-ye Jonubi Rural District, in the Central District of Qorveh County, Kurdistan Province, Iran. At the 2006 census, its population was 371, in 85 families. The village is populated by Kurds.

References 

Towns and villages in Qorveh County
Kurdish settlements in Kurdistan Province